is a binary near-Earth asteroid classified as a potentially hazardous object of the Apollo group. It was discovered on 5 June 2005 by the Siding Spring Survey at Siding Spring Observatory in Australia.

Physical characteristics 
For an absolute magnitude of 21.9, this radar-measured diameter indicates that  has a very low geometric albedo of 0.02.

Satellite 
The satellite's discovery was announced in a Central Bureau Electronic Telegram on 10 December 2022.

Notes

References

External links 
 2005 LW3: Timing Assessment, International Asteroid Warning Network, last updated 29 November 2022 
 Asteroid 2005 LW3 Campaign: Timing is Everything!, Leonard David, 5 November 2022
 
 
 

Minor planet object articles (unnumbered)

20221123
20050605